Ainea Ojiambo (born 20 April 1970), is a Kenyan actor. He is best known for the roles in the films The Constant Gardener, Bullion and Jack Zollo: My Life in Crime.

Personal life
He was born on 20 April 1970 in Nairobi, Kenya. He is a father to two children, a boy and a girl.

Career
Before entering popular screen, he worked in several stage plays and that is how his acting career began. In 2004, he was invited to play in the Hollywood film The Constant Gardener directed by Fernando Meirelles. In the film, he played a minor role of a 'Police Driver'. The film was a critical and box office success and earned four Oscar nominations. Then in 2007, he acted in the Kenyan television series Makutano Junction with the role of 'snake'.

After the success of the series, he was later invited to play in two more television serials: Block-D and Noose of Gold. In the soap opera Noose of Gold, Ojiambo played the lead role of 'Ole Mpisha'. The soap was later broadcast for 3 seasons across Africa in the Africa Magic Channel. In 2010, he made his second Hollywood film The First Grader, a biographical drama film directed by Justin Chadwick. In the film, he made a supportive role as an 'Education Official'.

In the following years, he made film appearance in the films, The Rugged Priest, Fundi-Mentals, Nairobi Half Life, Following Jesus, Babuz Babies, Kibera Kid, Closed hands, Stigma, Obohoz, The Rugged Priest, Guerilla Boy, and LoveDoctor. In 2014, he appeared in Ugandan crime drama film Bullion which was nominated to the Oscars with a supportive role.

Filmography

See also
 My Life with a Criminal: Milly's Story
 My Life in Crime

References

External links
 

Living people
1980 births
People from Nairobi
21st-century Kenyan male actors
Kenyan male film actors
Kenyan male television actors